Sagauli–Raxaul Railway was owned by the Segowlie–Raxaul Railway Company and worked by the Bengal and North Western Railway. The Sugauli–Raxaul Railway was absorbed by the Tirhoot Railway in around 1920.

Notes
 Rao, M.A. (1988). Indian Railways, New Delhi: National Book Trust, p. 37
 Rao, M.A. (1988). Indian Railways, New Delhi: National Book Trust, pp. 42–3
 Chapter 1 - Evolution of Indian Railways-Historical Background

Transport in Raxaul
Defunct railway companies of India

Railway companies disestablished in 1920
Year of establishment missing